Edward "Ed" Warren Miney (September 7, 1926 – August 23, 2006) and Lorraine Rita Warren (January 31, 1927 – April 18, 2019) were American paranormal investigators and authors associated with prominent cases of alleged hauntings. Edward was a self-taught and self-professed demonologist, author, and lecturer. Lorraine professed to be clairvoyant and a light trance medium who worked closely with her husband.

In 1952, the Warrens founded the New England Society for Psychic Research (NESPR), the oldest ghost hunting group in New England. They authored many books about the paranormal and about their private investigations into various reports of paranormal activity. They claimed to have investigated well over 10,000 cases during their career. The Warrens were among the first investigators in the Amityville haunting. According to the Warrens, the official website of the NESPR, Viviglam Magazine and several other sources, the NESPR uses a variety of individuals, including medical doctors, researchers, police officers, nurses, college students, and members of the clergy in its investigations.

Stories of ghost hauntings popularized by the Warrens have been adapted as or have indirectly inspired dozens of films, television series, and documentaries, including several films in the Amityville Horror series and the films in The Conjuring Universe.

Skeptics Perry DeAngelis and Steven Novella investigated the Warrens' evidence and described it as "blarney". Skeptical investigators Joe Nickell and Benjamin Radford concluded that the better known hauntings, Amityville and the Snedeker family haunting, did not happen and had been invented.

Notable investigations

Annabelle

According to the Warrens, in the year 1968, two roommates claimed their Raggedy Ann doll was possessed by the spirit of a young girl named Annabelle Higgins. The Warrens took the doll, telling the roommates it was "being manipulated by an inhuman presence", and put it on display at the family's "Occult Museum". The legend of the doll inspired several films in the Conjuring Universe and is a motif in many others.

Perron family 
In 1971, the Warrens claimed that the Harrisville, Rhode Island home of the Perron family was haunted by a witch who had lived there in the early 19th century. According to the Warrens, Bathsheba Sherman cursed the land so that whoever lived there somehow died a terrible death. The story is the subject of the 2013 film The Conjuring. Lorraine Warren was a consultant to the production and appeared in a cameo role in the film. A reporter for USA Today covered the film's supposed factual grounding.

Amityville

The Warrens are best known for their involvement in the 1975 Amityville Horror in which New York couple George and Kathy Lutz claimed that their house was haunted by a violent, demonic presence so intense that it eventually drove them out of their home.The Amityville Horror Conspiracy authors Stephen and Roxanne Kaplan characterized the case as a "hoax". Lorraine Warren told a reporter for The Express-Times newspaper that the Amityville Horror was not a hoax. The reported haunting was the basis for the 1977 book The Amityville Horror and adapted into the 1979 and 2005 films of the same name, while also serving as inspiration for the film series that followed. The Warrens' version of events is partially adapted and portrayed in the opening sequence of The Conjuring 2 (2016).  According to Benjamin Radford, the story was "refuted by eyewitnesses, investigations and forensic evidence". In 1979, lawyer William Weber stated that he, Jay Anson, and the occupants "invented" the horror story "over many bottles of wine".

Enfield poltergeist

In 1977, the Warrens investigated claims that a family in the North London suburb of Enfield was haunted by poltergeist activity. While a number of independent observers dismissed the incident as a hoax carried out by "attention-hungry" children, the Warrens were convinced that it was a case of "demonic possession". The story was the inspiration for The Conjuring 2, although critics say the Warrens were involved "to a far lesser degree than portrayed in the movie" and in fact had shown up to the scene uninvited and been refused admittance to the home.

Guy Lyon Playfair, a parapsychologist who investigated the Enfield case alongside Maurice Grosse, also says the film greatly exaggerated the Warrens' role in the investigation. He stated in 2016 that they "turned up once" and that Ed Warren told Playfair "[the Warrens] could make a lot of money [...] out of [the case]." He corroborated the claim that the Warrens were "not invited" to the Enfield house and that "Nobody [...] in the family had ever heard of him until [Ed Warren] turned up".

Arne Johnson

In 1981, Arne Cheyenne Johnson was accused of killing his landlord, Alan Bono. Ed and Lorraine Warren had been called prior to the killing to deal with the alleged demonic possession of the younger brother of Johnson's fiancée. The Warrens subsequently claimed that Johnson was also possessed. At trial, Johnson attempted to plead Not Guilty by Reason of Demonic Possession, but was unsuccessful with his plea. This story serves as the inspiration for The Conjuring: The Devil Made Me Do It (2021). The case was described in the 1983 book The Devil in Connecticut by Gerald Brittle.

Snedeker house
In 1986, Ed and Lorraine Warren arrived and proclaimed the Snedeker house, a former funeral home, to be infested with demons. The case was featured in the 1993 book In a Dark Place: The Story of a True Haunting. A TV film that later became part of the Discovery Channel series A Haunting was produced in 2002. The Haunting in Connecticut, a film based on the Warrens' version of events and directed by Peter Cornwell, was released in 2009. Horror author Ray Garton, who wrote an account of the alleged haunting of the Snedeker family in Southington, Connecticut, later called into question the veracity of the accounts contained in his book, saying, "The family involved, which was going through some serious problems like alcoholism and drug addiction, could not keep their story straight, and I became very frustrated; it's hard writing a non-fiction book when all the people involved are telling you different stories". To paranormal investigator Benjamin Radford, Garton said of Lorraine, "'If she told me the sun would come up tomorrow morning, I'd get a second opinion'".

Smurl family

Pennsylvania residents Jack and Janet Smurl reported their home was disturbed by numerous supernatural phenomena, including sounds, smells and apparitions. The Warrens became involved and claimed that the Smurl home was occupied by four spirits and also a demon that allegedly sexually assaulted Jack and Janet. The Smurls' version of their story was the subject of a 1986 paperback titled The Haunted and television film of the same name directed by Robert Mandel.

Union Cemetery

Ed Warren's book Graveyard: True Hauntings from an Old New England Cemetery (St Martins Press, 1992) features a "White Lady" ghost which haunts Union Cemetery. He claimed to have "captured her essence" on film.

Other activities
The Warrens were responsible for training several self-described demonologists, including Dave Considine and their nephew John Zaffis.

Ed Warren affair accusation

In 2017, Judith Penney claimed she had a 40-year-long sexual relationship with Ed, starting when she was underaged in 1963.

Personal life

Ed and Lorraine Warren were members of the Roman Catholic Church. They married in 1945.  On January 11, 1946, Lorraine gave birth to their daughter named Judy Warren.

The Warrens held that demonic forces are likely to possess those who lack faith.

Ed died on August 23, 2006, and Lorraine died on April 18, 2019. They were both buried at Stepney Cemetery in Monroe, Connecticut.

Criticism
According to a 1997 interview with the Connecticut Post, Steve Novella and Perry DeAngelis investigated the Warrens for the New England Skeptical Society (NESS). They found the couple to be pleasant people, but their claims of demons and ghosts to be "at best, as tellers of meaningless ghost stories, and at worst, dangerous frauds." They took the $13 tour and looked at all the evidence the Warrens had for spirits and ghosts. They watched the videos and looked at the best evidence the Warrens had. Their conclusion was that "It's all blarney." They found common errors with flash photography and nothing evil in the artifacts the Warrens had collected. "They have... a ton of fish stories about evidence that got away... They're not doing good scientific investigation; they have a predetermined conclusion which they adhere to, literally and religiously," according to Novella. Lorraine Warren said that the problem with Perry and Steve is that "they don't base anything on a God". Novella responded, "It takes work to do solid, critical thinking, to actually employ your intellectual faculties and come to a conclusion that actually reflects reality ... That's what scientists do every day, and that's what skeptics advocate".

In an article for The Sydney Morning Herald that examined whether supernatural films are really based on true events, that investigation was used as evidence to the contrary. As Novella is quoted, "They [the Warrens] claim to have scientific evidence which does indeed prove the existence of ghosts, which sounds like a testable claim into which we can sink our investigative teeth. What we found was a very nice couple, some genuinely sincere people, but absolutely no compelling evidence..." While it was made clear that neither DeAngelis nor Novella thought the Warrens would intentionally cause harm to anyone, they did caution that claims like the Warrens' served to reinforce delusions and confuse the public about legitimate scientific methodology.

Occult Museum 
In addition to investigations, Lorraine ran the Warrens' Occult Museum (now closed) in the back of her house in Monroe, Connecticut, with the help of her son-in-law, Tony Spera. The museum displayed many claimed haunted objects and artifacts from around the world. Many of the artifacts from their most famous investigations were featured. The museum is currently owned by Judy Warren and Tony Spera.

Bibliography

 Ghost Hunters: True Stories From the World's Most Famous Demonologists by Ed Warren (St. Martin's Press, 1989) 
 Ghost Tracks by Cheryl A. Wicks with Ed and Lorraine Warren (AuthorHouse, 2004) 
 Graveyard: True Hauntings from an Old New England Cemetery by Ed Warren (St Martins Press, 1992) 
 The Haunted: The True Story of One Family's Nightmare by Robert Curran with Jack Smurl and Janet Smurl and Ed and Lorraine Warren (St. Martin's Press, 1988) 
 Satan's Harvest by Ed & Lorraine Warren, Michael Lasalandra, Mark Merenda, Maurice & Nancy Theriault (Graymalkin Media, 2014; originally published 1990 by Dell Publishing) 
 Werewolf: A True Story of Demonic Possession by Ed Warren (St. Martin's Press, 1991)

Featured in
 Deliver Us From Evil: From the files of Ed and Lorraine Warren, by J. F. Sawyer (Phillips Publishing Company, 1973) 
 The Amityville Horror, a True Story by Jay Anson (Prentice Hall, 1977) 
 The Demonologist: The Extraordinary Career of Ed and Lorraine Warren by Gerald Brittle (Berkley Books, 1980) 
 The Devil in Connecticut by Gerald Brittle (Bantam Books, 1983) 
 In A Dark Place: The Story of a True Haunting by Ray Garton (Villard, 1992) 
 True Haunting of Borley Rectory (Conversations with Ed & Lorraine Warren: The original ghost hunters) by Taffy Sealyham (BookBaby, 2013) 
 The Warren Case Files

Media appearances
 Lorraine was featured in several episodes of the Discovery series A Haunting, in which she discusses some of the cases the pair worked on as paranormal investigators.
 Lorraine also appeared on Paranormal State, where she acted as a guest investigator.
 Both Ed and Lorraine have appeared on Scariest Places on Earth.
 Lorraine has a cameo appearance in the 2013 film The Conjuring, where she is also credited as a consultant.
 Lorraine appears in the 2012 documentary film My Amityville Horror, where she reunites with Daniel Lutz, whose family was allegedly plagued by supernatural happenings in 1975. Ed and Lorraine Warren originally visited the house after the Lutz family fled the house after 28 days of occupancy.

Film adaptations
Over the years, several films and series have been released that are based in part or in full on the paranormal investigations or events that the Warrens are said to have witnessed and described. Films that are partly based on their story are the films from The Amityville Horror series, including The Amityville Horror (1979) and The Amityville Horror (2005). In 1991, a two-hour made-for-TV film based on the Smurl haunting, titled The Haunted, was released by 20th Century Fox. Written by Robert Curran, Jack Smurl, Janet Smurl, Ed Warren, and Lorraine Warren, the film starred Jeffrey DeMunn as Jack Smurl and Sally Kirkland as Janet Smurl. The 2009 film The Haunting in Connecticut was loosely based on the 1986 Snedeker haunting investigated by the Warrens.

The Conjuring Universe

The Warrens' case files serve as the basis for The Conjuring Universe series of horror films.

The 2013 film The Conjuring, directed by James Wan, spotlights a Warren case and stars Patrick Wilson and Vera Farmiga as Ed and Lorraine Warren. Its 2014 follow-up, Annabelle, a supernatural psychological horror film directed by John R. Leonetti, is both a prequel to and spin-off of The Conjuring and was inspired by a story of the Annabelle doll. It stars Annabelle Wallis, Ward Horton, and Alfre Woodard. The Conjuring Universe's next film was 2016's The Conjuring 2, a sequel to The Conjuring, directed by Wan, and with Farmiga and Wilson reprising their roles as Lorraine and Ed, respectively. It is based on the Enfield Poltergeist case. 2017 saw the release of another prequel, Annabelle: Creation, telling the origin story of the Annabelle doll. Farmiga and Wilson briefly appeared as Ed and Lorraine in the 2018 spin-off film The Nun, focusing on the character of Valak in its "Demon Nun" form, who was the villain from The Conjuring 2. The two reprised their roles again in Annabelle Comes Home, the sequel to Annabelle, and The Conjuring: The Devil Made Me Do It.

References

External links
 The New England Society For Psychic Research
 Article Detailing the Recent Danbury Court Case
 Hunting the Ghost Hunters: An Investigation of Ed and Lorraine Warren – Perry DeAngelis and Steven Novella
 The Demonologist Page on the Warrens – contains brief biographical information
 
 
 JREF reprint of Ray Garton letter – Ray Garton Letter refuting the Warrens
 
 
 Ed Warren and Lorraine Warren at WorldCat
 

Married couples
Paranormal investigators
Writers from Bridgeport, Connecticut
The Amityville Horror
Demonologists
People from Monroe, Connecticut